The Tokyo DisneySea Hotel MiraCosta was the second hotel built at Tokyo Disney Resort in Urayasu, Chiba, Japan. It opened on September 4, 2001, alongside the opening of the Tokyo DisneySea theme park. It was constructed under a license by The Walt Disney Company. The hotel is managed by The Oriental Land Company.

The hotel gains the distinction of being the only hotel in the world which is entirely placed inside a Disney theme park. It is located above the Mediterranean Harbor port in Tokyo DisneySea. The hotel is themed after the ports of Portofino and Venice.

Resort

Rooms 
The hotel offers rooms on three sides, these are from highest priced to lowest; the Porto Paradiso side offering views of Mount Prometheus and Fantasmic, the Venice Side facing the Venetian gondolas, and the Tuscany side facing the park and hotel entrances.  Interior design by Kenneth Gomes.

Guests enter Tokyo DisneySea through a special entrance in the hotel available only to hotel guests.

Dining 
There are three restaurants in the hotel.
 BelleVista Lounge - Lobby lounge serving Italian cuisine and drinks
 Oceano - Mediterranean restaurant offering both a buffet and course menu facing the Mediterranean Harbor area of the park
 Silk Road Garden - Chinese restaurant

MickeyAngelo Gifts 
Serves as both a convenience store and gift shop for hotel guests.

Pools and other paid amenities 
The resort charges guests an additional fee for access to these amenities.
 Outdoor pool - only open during the summer season
 Indoor pool
 Hippocampi pool bar
 Spa area
 Fitness room

Wedding chapel 

Chapel MiraCosta is one of three locations where weddings are offered at Tokyo Disney Resort, also offering private banquet rooms for receptions.

References

Hotels in Tokyo Disney Resort
Hotel buildings completed in 2001
Hotels established in 2001